Paul Thorne and his wife Mabel Thorne were American authors who wrote several murder mystery novels and short stories in the early twentieth-century.

Novels

Together
The Sheridan Road Mystery, Dodd, Mead and Company (1921)
The Secret Toll, Dodd, Mead (1922)

Paul Thorne only
Spiderweb Clues, Penn Publishing (1928)
Murder in the Fog, Penn (c.1929)
That Evening in Shanghai, Penn (c.1931)

References

External links
  
 
  

American male writers